Alida Francis (Sint Eustatius, ca. 1965 ) is a Dutch civil servant. She has been government commissioner of Sint Eustatius since 15 February 2020.

Francis was born and raised on St. Eustatius. Between 1977 and 1985 she lived in Aruba, where she obtained her HAVO diploma at the Colegio Arubano. She then went on to study journalism at the Hogeschool Utrecht. 

Her career started in 1989 as a broadcast journalist in Sint Maarten. A year later she transferred to the government, where she started working in the office of the Lieutenant Governor of Sint Maarten as a specialist in protocol and public relations.  Between 1992 and 2010 she was director of the Sint Eustatius Tourism Development Foundation. In 1995 she was appointed a member of the Nation Building Committee of the Netherlands Antilles on behalf of Sint Eustatius.

From 2010, Francis was employed by the National Office for the Caribbean Netherlands, where as acting head of communication she is responsible for all communication strategies for the BES islands. After hurricane Irma, she made an important contribution to the reconstruction of St. Eustatius.

Francis has been deputy government commissioner of St. Eustatius since 15 February 2020, succeeding Mervyn Stegers . Together with the government commissioner, Marnix van Rij. Since taking charge Francis has been responsible with getting the government on St. Eustatius back on course.  The functions of government commissioner and the deputy. government commissioner were appointed in February 2018 after the executive council and the island council of St. Eustatius were set aside due to gross neglect of duties. She was appointed government commissioner of St. Eustatius with effect from 22 June 2021. Her successor as deputy government commissioner is Claudia Toet.

References 

Lieutenant Governors of Sint Eustatius
1965 births
Living people
Sint Eustatius politicians
Sint Eustatius women in politics